Yockenthwaite is a hamlet in the Craven district of North Yorkshire, England. It lies in the Langstrothdale valley in the Yorkshire Dales National Park. The name of the hamlet is said to derive from Eoghan's clearing in a wood.

Yockenthwaite lies on the north bank of the River Wharfe. It is better known than may be expected because a children's television character from The Rottentrolls takes its name from the hamlet.

The hamlet is connected to the road that winds up and down Langstrothdale by a grade II listed bridge from the early 18th century. This is the only route into and out of the hamlet via road transport.

Yockenthwaite stone circle

Just to the west of the village by Yockenthwaite Cave, are some ancient stones arranged in a circle. The overall size and layout of the stones gave rise to the nickname of the Giant's Grave. Some of the stones have been taken and re-used for drystone walls and buildings.

Speight refers to the site as a "druid's circle" and whilst it has been described as a stone circle, it is believed to be a ring cairn. Whilst 23 stones remain extant, there are spaces for three to four more stones in the circle, which have been removed.

References

External links

Hamlets in North Yorkshire
Wharfedale